Agylla obliquisigna is a moth of the family Erebidae. It was described by William Schaus in 1899. It is found in Colombia.

References

Moths described in 1899
obliquisigna
Moths of South America